William Dunn Dalrymple (February 7, 1891 – July 14, 1967) was an American professional baseball player who played in three games for the St. Louis Browns in .
He was born in Baltimore, Maryland and died at the age of 76 in San Diego, California.

External links

1891 births
1967 deaths
Baseball players from Baltimore
St. Louis Browns players